P. Narsa Reddy  was an Indian freedom fighter, politician and Member of Parliament of the 9th Lok Sabha of India. Reddy represented the Adilabad constituency of Andhra Pradesh and was a member of the Indian National Congress political party.

Early life and education
P. Narsa Reddy was born in Nirmal, Adilabad district in the state of Andhra Pradesh. He attended the Osmania University and attained BA & LL.B degrees. By profession, Reddy is an Agriculturist and a Lawyer.

Political career

Pre independence
P. Narsa Reddy was an Indian freedom fighter, participated in the struggle to liberate Hyderabad from Nizam's Rule.

Post independence
P. Narsa Reddy has been in active politics since early 1940s. Prior to becoming an MP he was also Member of the Legislative Assembly (India) for three straight terms and member of Andhra Pradesh Legislative Council for one term. In 1971, he was the President of Andhra Pradesh Congress Committee.

Posts held

See also
9th Lok Sabha
Adilabad (Lok Sabha constituency)
Andhra Pradesh Legislative Assembly
Government of India
Indian National Congress
Lok Sabha
Nirmal (Assembly constituency)
Parliament of India
Politics of India

References

India MPs 1989–1991
1931 births
Indian National Congress politicians from Andhra Pradesh
Living people
Lok Sabha members from Andhra Pradesh
People from Adilabad district
People from Adilabad
Members of the Andhra Pradesh Legislative Council
Indian independence activists from Andhra Pradesh